John Edward Reinhardt (March 8, 1920 – February 18, 2016) was an American ambassador and diplomat.

Reinhardt was born in Glade Spring, Virginia and raised in Knoxville, Tennessee. After graduating from Knoxville College in 1939, he attended the University of Chicago, initially pursuing a graduate degree in English, but did not finish on account to serving in World War II. His doctorate in English was completed in 1950 at the University of Wisconsin–Madison. He was the American ambassador to Nigeria from 1971 to 1975. From 1975 to 1977, he was Assistant Secretary of State for Public Affairs. He became the director of the United States Information Agency from 1977 to 1980. He was a member of the Peabody Awards Board of Jurors from 1980 to 1987 Reinhardt later was a professor of political science at the University of Vermont from 1987 to 1991.

On June 16, 2004 he joined a group of twenty seven called Diplomats and Military Commanders for Change opposing the Iraq War. He died on February 18, 2016.

References

 The Political Graveyard
 

1920 births
2016 deaths
Ambassadors of the United States to Nigeria
American political scientists
People from Knoxville, Tennessee
University of Chicago alumni
Knoxville College alumni
University of Wisconsin–Madison College of Letters and Science alumni
University of Vermont faculty
United States Assistant Secretaries of State
American military personnel of World War II